Southwest Community Park is a public park in Gresham, Oregon, United States.

External links
 
 Southwest Community Park at the City of Gresham, Oregon

Gresham, Oregon
Municipal parks in Oregon